The Daily Chronicle is a newspaper which covers DeKalb County in northern Illinois. Its newsroom and press are located in DeKalb, Illinois, a city about 60 miles west of Chicago along Interstate 88. The paper has a daily circulation of 19,968 and a Saturday/Sunday "Weekend Edition" circulation of 20,719, as of September 30, 2006. It was formerly owned by Scripps League Newspapers, which was acquired by Pulitzer in 1996; Lee Enterprises acquired Pulitzer in 2005. Shaw Newspapers (now Shaw Media) of Dixon, Illinois acquired the newspaper in late 2007.

Prior to 1970, the publication ran under the title The DeKalb Daily Chronicle, which began publication in 1909.

Notes

External links

DeKalb, Illinois
Newspapers published in Illinois
Companies based in DeKalb County, Illinois